Aaron Darnell Spears (born July 10, 1971) is an American actor. He portrayed Officer Jones in the 2011 romantic-comedy 35 and Ticking; opposite Kevin Hart and actor Keith Robinson and also appeared in the film White People Money (2020). Spears also guest-starred as numerous of criminals in several of police-procedural sitcoms such as Arrest & Trial, The District, The Division, Criminal Minds, and Boston Legal and also more guest appearances on several romantic-comedy sitcoms including Everybody Loves Raymond and Half & Half. He also had a recurring role in the sitcom Girlfriends' Guide to Divorce and is currently portraying Sgt. Lane on the sitcom The Black Hamptons.

Biography
Spears was born in Washington, D.C. He studied computer science and mathematics at Delaware State University.

In 2001, Spears played "Money" in Craig Ross Jr.'s Bluehill Avenue alongside Allen Payne, and Michael "Bear" Taliaferro. He portrays Justin Barber on the American soap opera The Bold and the Beautiful and Lt. Raines on soap opera Days Of Our Lives and Mark Bradley in Being Mary Jane alongside Gabrielle Union as the title role. His previous television credits include guest roles on Bones, Criminal Minds, Shark and Everybody Loves Raymond. He had a guest starring role on the NCIS: Los Angeles episode "The Silo" on November 12, 2017.

Filmography

Film

Television

References

 CBS: Aaron D. Spears as Justin Barber

External links

African-American male actors
American male soap opera actors
Male actors from Washington, D.C.
Living people
1971 births
American male television actors
21st-century African-American people
20th-century African-American people